This is a list of songs about Dublin, Ireland, including parts of the city such as individual neighborhoods and sections, and famous personages, arranged chronologically.

18th century
"The Night Before Larry Was Stretched" - about the night before a hanging, in old Newgate cant; recorded by Frank Harte. Other Dublin execution ballads from this period include "The Kilmainham Minit", "Luke Caffrey's Ghost" and "Larry's Ghost".
"The Dublin Privateer", late 1700s
"The Dublin Baker", late 1700s
"The Dublin Tragedy, or, the Unfortunate Merchant's Daughter", late 1700s
"Miss King of Dublin", late 1700s
"The Country Recruit's Description of the Military", late 1700s
"A New Song on the Police Guards", late 1700s
"The May Bush", late 1700s
"Lock Hospital" (also known as "St. James Hospital" and "The Unfortunate Rake") - Irish version of a song also found in Britain and the USA (where it developed into "The Dying Cowboy" and "St. James Infirmary)"

19th century
"Ye Men of Sweet Liberties Hall" - written by Dubliner Zozimus (Michael Moran, 1794–1846) about the Dublin Liberties.
"The Holly and Ivy Girl" - a Christmas song written by John Keegan (1809–1849).
"Donnelly and Cooper" - relates a bout between the Dublin boxer and an Englishman, from about 1845
"The Twangman" - a comical murder ballad attributed (by Dominic Behan) to Zozimus (Michael Moran).
"The Finding of Moses" - a comical ballad attributed to Zozimus (Michael Moran).
"Molly Malone" - probably the best-known song about Dublin.
"Courtin' in the Kitchen" - a music-hall-type song made popular by Delia Murphy.
"The Spanish Lady" - a man becomes enamoured of a Spanish lady; versions of this popular song were recorded by Al O'Donnell, the Clancy Brothers and the Dubliners.
"The Return of Pat Malloy"
"The Little Beggarman" - sung to the melody of the "Red-Haired Boy", recorded by The Clancy Brothers.
"General Guinness" - a song about the stout from Dublin, recorded by The Boys of the Lough.
"Miss Brown of Dublin City" - a murder ballad related to "The Cruel Ship's Carpenter", recorded by Ed McCurdy.
"'Twas in the end of King James's Street" - a romance ending in tragedy, from the Petrie collection
"The Humours of Donnybrook Fair", 1830-1850 - at least three songs were written about Donnybrook Fair.
"Hannah Healy, the Pride of Howth", c. 1840 - about a girl from Howth.
"The Phenix of Fingal", c. 1840
"Catherine Skelly, for the Drowning of her Child", c. 1850
"Willy O", c. 1850
"The Seducer Outwitted", c. 1850
"Tim Finigan's Wake" - also known as "Finnegan's Wake" - mid 19th-century broadside and music-hall song published in New York, attributed to John F. Poole. to an air called "The French Musician"
"Sally and Johnny", c. 1854
"The True-Lovers' Trip to the Strawberry Beds", c. 1854 - about a trip to a favourite courting spot.
"The Night of the Ragman's Ball" - collected by Colm O'Lochlainn from a ballad singer in Thomas Street in 1913; melody, called "It was in Dublin city", is in the Petrie collection (1855). Luke Cheevers said it, and a follow-up, "The Ragman's Wake", was written by Tommy Winters, who died in WW1. Recorded by Frank Harte, The Dubliners.
"The Rocky Road to Dublin" - a rollicking song written by Galwayman D. K. Gavan for music-hall artist Harry Clifton around 1863.
"Lannigan's Ball" - written by Galwayman D. K. Gavan for popular music-hall artist Harry Clifton around 1863.
"Dublin Jack of All Trades" - a broadside ballad from the 1860s recorded by The Johnstons, among others.
"Tied my Toes to the Bed", c. 1870
"The New Tramway", on the new horse tramway of the Dublin Tramway Company, 1872.
"Waxies' Dargle" - about the annual outing to Ringsend by Dublin cobblers (waxies).

1900 - 1950
"Girls of Dublin Town (Gals of Dublin Town)" - a shanty based on a real ship, the Shanandoah, captained by "Shotgun" Murphy
"The Pride of Pimlico" - a song about the Dublin Liberties written by Arthur Griffith.
"The Cruise of the Calabar" - a comical song about a canal barge by Arthur Griffith
"Twenty Men From Dublin Town" - written by Arthur Griffith, recorded by Danny Doyle
"Down by the Liffeyside (Fish and Chips)" - written by Peadar Kearney
"Dying Rebel" - a song about the aftermath of the 1916 Rising in Dublin
"The Recruiting Sergeant" - Written by Dublin journalist Seamus O'Farrell (1886–1973) in 1915; recorded by, among others, Dominic Behan and The Black Brothers.
"Easy and Slow" - a song of somewhat constant innuendo set in Dublin's Liberties
"Biddy Mulligan the Pride of the Coombe" - written by Seamas Kavanagh about a Dublin street-seller, made popular by Jimmy O'Dea.
"Daffodil Mulligan (Fresh Fish)" - written by Harry O'Donovan, music by Eva Brennan, about Biddy Mulligan's daughter.
"The Vamp of Inchicore" - written by Harry O'Donovan, recorded by Jimmy O'Dea
"Rathgar" - written by Harry O'Donovan, recorded by Jimmy O'Dea
"The Dublin Fusiliers" - comical song about the regiment, recorded by Jimmy O'Dea in the 1930s, later by the Dubliners.
"Hannigan's Hooley" - written by Cecil Sheridan, recorded by Maureen Potter
"I'm On My Way To Dublin Bay" by Owen J McCormack
"Kevin Barry" - about young medical student and Irish revolutionary Kevin Barry controversially executed during the Irish War of Independence
"The Foggy Dew" - about the Easter Rising of 1916, written by Canon Charles O’Neill in 1919.
"The Row in the Town" - a song written by Peadar Kearney commemorating the 1916 Rising.
"Dublin City 1913" - the struggle from 1913 to 1916, written by Donagh MacDonagh
"The Banks of the Dargle"
"Arbour Hill" - written by Declan Hunt about the burial place of the Easter 1916 Leaders.

1950 - 2000
"The Auld Triangle" - by writer Brendan Behan, about his time in Mountjoy Prison
"The Dublin Saunter (Dublin Can Be Heaven)" - by Leo Maguire, made famous by Noel Purcell
"The Burning of the Abbey Theatre" - a comical song about the Abbey Theatre by Sylvester Gaffney (Leo Maguire).
"Three Lovely Lasses from Kimmage" - a comical song by Sylvester Gaffney (Leo Maguire).
"Dublin Me Darlin'" - written by Sylvester Gaffney (Leo Maguire), recorded by Danny Doyle.
"Monto (Take Her Up To Monto)" - a song by George Hodnett about the famous red-light district around Montgomery Street in Dublin.
"On Raglan Road" - Patrick Kavanagh poem to the 19th-century melody "The Dawning of the Day"
"The Ferryman" - about the ferries on the River Liffey, by Pete St. John.
"Ringsend Rose" - about a girl from Ringsend, written by Pete St. John.
"Dublin Lady" - by singer/songwriter John Conolly. Not written by the excellent John Conolly but rather by Patrick Carroll (lyric) and Andy Irvine (music).
"From Dublin With Love" - by Newfoundland singer/songwriter Ron Hynes
"The Black Dodder" - written and recorded by Dublin singer/songwriter/actor Mick Fitzgerald.
"Drink" - written and recorded by Dublin singer/songwriter/actor Mick Fitzgerald.
"Dublin you live in my heart" - by Ian Campbell
"Dublin Town (Fly Me Home)"
"Dublin Take Me" - by Rab Noakes
"The Dublin Rambler" - recorded by the Dublin City Ramblers
"The Dublin Minstrel Boy (Luke Kelly)" - written and recorded by Paddy Reilly.
"Summer in Dublin" - written by Liam Reilly and recorded by Bagatelle
"Leeson Street Lady" - recorded by Bagatelle.
"Anne Devlin" - about Robert Emmet's sweetheart, by Pete St John
"Mother Redcaps" - song by Pete St John about a cherished music pub in the Dublin Liberties, closed in 2005
"Danny Farrell" - a song about a traveller, by Pete St John, recorded by The Dubliners
"Rosie Up in Moore Street" - about a Dublin street dealer, by Pete St John
"Dicey Riley" - Dublin song about a woman who enjoys her little drop, with verses by Dominic Behan and Tom Munnelly
"The Zoological Gardens" - by Dominic Behan about Dublin Zoo
"Come Out Ye Black and Tans" - British Army-taunting song written by Dominic Behan
"The Mero" - a song about a former cinema in Mary St., Dublin, popular with children, by Pete St. John
"Johnie McGory" - a song about children, by Pete St John, recorded by The Dubliners
"Ringsend Boatman" - by Pete St John
"The Maid From Cabra West" - an Irish version of an English song, sung by Frank Harte
"Dublin City in 1962" - written by musician and footballer Dermot O'Brien
"Dublin in my Tears" - written by Dubliner Brendan Phelan and recorded by the Dublin City Ramblers
"Dublin" - written and recorded by Phil Lynott in 1972
"Inner City Song" - written by harmonica-player Don Baker about 1974 which became a hit for the Jolly Beggarmen (with Baker on harmonica and Johnny Carroll on vocals)
"Meet Me At The Pillar" - about the 1916 Rising, by Seán and Frank O'Meara; recorded by Jim McCann, the Dublin City Ramblers, and others.
"My Last Farewell" - by Seán and Frank O'Meara, based on Padraic Pearse's last letter; recorded by the Barleycorn (vocals by Derek McCormack).
"Dublin in the Rare Old Times" - 1980s song about Dublin before the 1960s (composer: Pete St. John)
"Grace" - written in 1985 by Frank and Seán O'Meara about Grace Gifford; recorded by Anthony Kearns, the Wolfe Tones and others.
"My Dublin Bay" - composed by Waterford-born May O'Higgins.
"Old Dublin Town" by Pete St. John
"At the Metropole" - written by Paul Barrett, recorded by Metropolis in 1981.
"The Rose of Inchicore" - written by Dublin singer/songwriter Mick Fitzgerald about a girl from Inchicore
"Farewell to Dublin" - written and performed by Brian Warfield
"Second World Song" - written by David McDonagh, recorded by the Dubliners.
"D'Ya Remember Jem" - recorded by Ronnie Drew
 "Baile Atha Cliath" - for solo recorder, composed by Juan María Solare
 "Christchurch Bells" - written and performed by Hothouse Flowers

Since 2000

 “Zozimus Waltz” by John Brown (2012)

"Dublin" - by Prefab Sprout
"800 Voices" - about the Artane Industrial school, written and recorded by Danny Ellis
"The Bold Christian Brothers" - about the Artane Industrial school, written and recorded by Danny Ellis
"Dublin Sky" - written and recorded by Darren Hayes
"The Ballad of Ronnie Drew - by U2, the Dubliners and others; #1 in March 2008
"Bully's Acre" - a reference to the Bully's Acre, by Kíla, on their Rogha album (2009).
"True Blue" - written in 2011 by John Healy, Toddy Griffin and Pat Good, performed by Damien Dempsey and many others for charity.
"Paint the Town Green"-The Script 2014
"Dublin city sky" - Fontaines D.C. (2019)

See also
Music of Ireland

References

External links

 
Irish styles of music
Dublin
Dublin
Dublin
Songs
Culture in Dublin (city)